Jacksonia scoparia, commonly known as dogwood (from its strong odour when burning), is a native species of a pea-flowered, greyish, leafless, broom-like shrub or small tree that occurs in the south east of Queensland, Australia and eastern New South Wales.

Description
Jacksonia scoparia grows as a shrub or small tree, reaching 12 m in height. Its grey bark is rough with furrows.

Taxonomy
Scottish botanist Robert Brown described the dogwood in 1811 in Rees's Cyclopædia, from material sent by John White and George Caley to Kew Garden. The genus name honours George Jackson and the species name is derived from the foliage, which resembles Scotch broom (Cytisus scoparius). Jenny Chappill classified it in Group 4 within the genus, along with Jacksonia chappilliae, Jacksonia rhadinoclona and Jacksonia stackhousei—all from eastern Australia.

Dogwood Creek in Queensland was named after the profusion of the plant in the area by explorer Ludwig Leichhardt on 23 October 1844 during his expedition from Moreton Bay to Port Essington (now Darwin, Northern Territory).

Distribution and habitat
It is often seen growing on high exposed ridges in and around the Oxley Wild Rivers National Park on the Northern Tablelands (New South Wales). The yellow 'pea'-type flowers appear in October and November in racemes from the upper branches.

Uses and cultivation
Its tendency to flower profusely makes J. scoparia an attractive subject for the garden. It was introduced into cultivation in England in 1803. It can be grown in sun or part-shaded positions. During droughts, dogwood has provided a useful fodder that is relished by cattle. Propagation is relatively easy from seed following pre-treatment with boiling water (similar to other members of the pea family). Cuttings also strike reasonably readily.

References

External links
 The Australasian Virtual Herbarium – Occurrence data for Jacksonia scoparia

Mirbelioids
Fabales of Australia
Flora of New South Wales
Flora of Queensland
scoparia
Taxa named by Robert Brown (botanist, born 1773)
Plants described in 1811